is a train station in Yamashina-ku ward, city of Kyoto, Kyoto Prefecture, Japan.

The station has two separated sections: underground subway section and above-ground JR section. In addition,  on the Keishin Line of Keihan Electric Railway is located just in front of the JR station. This article also covers the Keihan station.

Lines 
  
 Tōkaidō Line (Biwako Line)
 Kosei Line
  
   (Station Number: T07)
 Keihan Electric Railway (Keihan Yamashina Station)
 Keishin Line

Layout

Yamashina Station (JR West)
The JR station has two island platforms with four tracks.

This station is an intermediate station on the "Biwako Line", but only the Tokaido Line for Maibara is informed as that common name, and the line for Kyoto and Osaka is as the "JR Kyoto Line". There are trains of the Biwako Line and the Kosei Line between this station and Kyoto.

Yamashina Station (Kyoto Subway Tozai Line) 
The subway station has an island platform with two tracks.

Keihan Yamashina Station (Keihan Keishin Line) 
The Keihan station has two side platforms with two tracks.

History 
Station numbering was introduced to the JR lines in March 2018 with Yamashina being assigned station number JR-A30 for the Biwako Line and JR B-30 for the Kosei Line.

Adjacent stations 

|-
!colspan=5|West Japan Railway Company (JR West) (Yamashina)

|-
!colspan=5|Keihan Electric Railway (Keihan Yamashina)

Yamashina Station (first)

References

External links
  Yamashina Station from jr-odekake.net (JR West)
  Yamashina Station (Kyoto Municipal Transportation Bureau)
  Keihan-Yamashina Station from Okeihan.net (Keihan Electric Railway)

Railway stations in Kyoto Prefecture
Tōkaidō Main Line
Railway stations in Kyoto
Stations of Keihan Electric Railway
Railway stations in Japan opened in 1921